La Guérinière is a commune in the Vendée department in the Pays de la Loire region in western France. It lies on the island of Noirmoutier. The town is protected from winter winds on the ocean side by a cordon of dunes.

Geography 
The altitude of the commune of La Guérinière lies between 0 and 20 meters. The area of the commune is 7.82 km2. It lies 4 km south of Noirmoutier-en-l'Île, the nearest larger town.

See also
Communes of the Vendée department

References

Communes of Vendée